Shuyang is a town in Nanjing County, southern Fujian province, China.

See also
List of township-level divisions of Fujian

References

Township-level divisions of Fujian
Zhangzhou